CCGS Cape Cockburn  is one of the Canadian Coast Guard's 36 s. Cape Cockburn was built in the Victoria Shipyards, in Vancouver, and is stationed at Powell River, British Columbia.

Design
It contains two, computer-operated Caterpillar 3196 diesel engines, providing a combined . It has two  four-blade propellers, and its complement is four crew members and five passengers.

Communication options include Raytheon 152 HF-SSB and Motorola Spectra 9000 VHF50W radios, and a Raytheon RAY 430 loudhailer system. The boat also supports the Simrad TD-L1550 VHF-FM radio direction finder. Raytheon provides a number of other electronic systems for the lifeboat, including the RAYCHART 620, the ST 30 heading indicator and ST 50 depth indicator, the NAV 398 global positioning system, a RAYPILOT 650 autopilot system, and either the R41X AN or SPS-69 radar systems.

References

Cape-class motor lifeboats
2003 ships
Ships built in British Columbia
Ships of the Canadian Coast Guard